xCAT (Extreme Cloud Administration Toolkit) is open-source distributed computing management software developed by IBM, used for the deployment and administration of Linux or AIX based clusters.

Toolkit 
xCAT can:

 Create and manage diskless clusters
 Install and manage many Linux cluster machines (physical or virtual) in parallel
 Set up a high-performance computing software stack, including software for batch job submission, parallel libraries, and other software that is useful on a cluster
 Cloning and imaging Linux and Windows machines

xCAT has specific features designed to take advantage of IBM hardware including:
 Remote Power Control
 Remote POST/BIOS console
 Serial over LAN functions
 Hardware alerts and vitals provided via SNMP and email
 Inventory and hardware management

xCAT achieved recognition in June 2008 for having been used with the IBM Roadrunner, which set a computing speed record at that time.

xCAT is the default systems management tool of the IBM Intelligent Cluster solution.

xCAT is used by Lenovo.

References

External links 
 xCAT Home Page
 xCAT's documentation on ReadTheDocs
  (old releases)
 xCAT on Github

Cluster computing
Free software programmed in Perl
Software using the Eclipse license
IBM software